Shell Presents was an early attempt at Australian television drama, being an umbrella title for several different productions. It debuted on 4 April 1959, and aired on ATN-7 and GTV-9, who split production of plays for the series between them. It was an anthology series, each program being a self-contained play for television. The series won a Logie award in 1960 for TV Highlight of 1959. As the title suggests, it was sponsored by Shell.  It was described as "a very big deal for the station: major institutional sponsorship from international companies for locally produced drama." It would be followed by The General Motors Hour.

Though it usually presented straight drama, it also presented a live musical production titled Pardon Miss Westcott, set in colonial-era Australia. A total of 13 productions aired under the Shell Presents banner from 1959 to 1960. There is little information about this series online, however, some of the productions are held at the National Film and Sound Archive
ATN-7 originally announced that the second episode of Shell Presents would be an adaptation of Children of the Sun by Morris West but that was not made.

The first drama from GTV-9 in Melbourne was meant to be a production of Arthur Miller's All My Sons.

Some of the productions were based on overseas plays (such as Thunder of Silence), while some were locally written, such as The Big Day (by Sydney author John Ford).

An article in the 30 October 1960 edition of the Sydney Morning Herald called Australian TV is growing up, while not mentioning it by name, nevertheless provides some information on the series. The article said that the production of "modestly unpretensious" soap opera Autumn Affair provided some of the experience needed to produce Shell Presents productions like Johnny Belinda, and listed the cost to produce Pardon Miss Westcott at £5,000 (a considerable budget at the time). It mentions that work on a live drama production of the era started a month to six weeks before telecast, and that a video-tape of the final rehearsal was made so cast and camera crew could correct last minute faults.

Five of the episodes may have been shown in Perth during 1960 on station TVW-7.

History
In February 1959 leading Australian writers were invited to present plays for the series.

Episodes
Johnny Belinda – originally aired 4 April 1959
Other People's Houses – 2 May 1959
Tragedy in a Temporary Town – 16 May 1959
They Were Big, They Were Blue, They Were Beautiful 27 June 1959
The Big Day – 11 July 1959
Thunder of Silence – 22 August 1959
Ruth – 5 September 1959
A Tongue of Silver – 17 October 1959
Rope – 14 November 1959
Pardon Miss Westcott – 12 December 1959
Reflections in Dark Glasses – 6 February 1960
No Picnic Tomorrow – 9 January 1960
Man in a Blue Vase – 5 March 1960

Ratings Success
On 20 July 1959 a Sydney Morning Herald article said the program had an estimated audience of around 300,000 in both Sydney and in Melbourne.

See also
List of live television plays broadcast on Australian Broadcasting Corporation (1950s) – One-off plays on ABC
Killer in Close-Up – 1957–1958 anthology of four half-hour plays on ABC
List of television plays broadcast on ATN-7

References

External links
Shell Presents at National Film and Sound Archive
Shell Presents at Austlit

Seven Network original programming
Nine Network original programming
Australian drama television series
1959 Australian television series debuts
1960 Australian television series endings
1950s Australian television plays
Black-and-white Australian television shows
English-language television shows
Australian anthology television series
Television shows set in Sydney
Television shows set in Melbourne